The Girl with Brains in Her Feet is a 1997 British comedy film directed by Roberto Bangura. It was screened in the Contemporary World Cinema section of the 1997 Toronto International Film Festival.

Cast
 Amanda Mealing as Vivienne Jones
 Joanna Ward as Jacqueline 'Jack' Jones
 Jamie McIntosh as Poor Bastard
 Jodie Smith as Maxine
 Richard Claxton as Steve Green
 John Thomson as Mr. Loughborough

References

External links
 

1997 films
1997 comedy films
1997 directorial debut films
British comedy films
1990s English-language films
1990s British films